John Linegar (b and d  Dublin; 1671 - 1757) was  an Irish Roman Catholic bishop in the mid 18th century.

Linegar was born in Broadstone, Dublin and ordained priest in 1694. He trained for the priesthood in the Irish College at Lisbon, he served as a curate in St. Michan's Catholic Church, Dublin. He was appointed Archbishop of Dublin in 1734. He died in post on 21 June1757.

Notes

1659 births
1733 deaths
Christian clergy from Dublin (city)
18th-century Roman Catholic archbishops in Ireland
Roman Catholic archbishops of Dublin